Nunberg is a surname. Notable people with the surname include:

 Geoffrey Nunberg, American linguist
 Hermann Nunberg (1884–1970), psychoanalyst and neurologist born in Będzin, Poland
 Sam Nunberg, political advisor to Donald Trump's 2016 presidential campaign

See also
 Vogt–Nunberg Farm, a Wibaux, Montana National Register of Historic Places site
 Nürburg
 Nuremberg
 Nürnberg